Shun Ikeda (池田 駿, born November 29, 1992 in Izumozaki, Niigata Prefecture) is a Japanese professional baseball pitcher for the Tohoku Rakuten Golden Eagles in Japan's Nippon Professional Baseball. He previously played with the Yomiuri Giants from 2017 to 2019 before joining the Golden Eagles in 2020.

External links

NPB stats

1992 births
Living people
Japanese baseball players
Nippon Professional Baseball pitchers
Tohoku Rakuten Golden Eagles players
Yomiuri Giants players
Baseball people from Niigata Prefecture